Giovanni Onorato (February 7, 1910 - February 23, 1960) was an Italian film actor. He was the father of the actor Glauco Onorato and the cinematographer Marco Onorato.

Selected filmography
 La stella del cinema (1931)
 Doctor Antonio (1937)
 Ettore Fieramosca (1938)
 It Always Ends That Way (1939)
 The King's Jester (1941)
 Beatrice Cenci (1941)
 The King of England Will Not Pay (1941)
 The Two Tigers (1941)
 The Gorgon (1942)
 Captain Tempest (1942)
 Bengasi (1942)
 Rossini (1942)
 Rita of Cascia (1943)
 Il fanciullo del West (1943)
 Macario Against Fantomas (1944)
 The Adulteress (1946)
 Anthony of Padua (1949)
 Margaret of Cortona (1950)
 The Force of Destiny (1950)
 The Blind Woman of Sorrento (1952)
 I, Hamlet (1952)
 The Little World of Don Camillo (1952)
 Barrier of the Law (1954)
 Don Camillo's Last Round (1955)

References

Bibliography
 Chiti, Roberto & Poppi, Roberto. Dizionario del cinema italiano: Dal 1945 al 1959. Gremese Editore, 1991.

External links

1910 births
1960 deaths
Male actors from Palermo
Italian male film actors
Italian male stage actors
20th-century Italian male actors